Layle Antonio Delo (born 28 October 1989) is a former South African rugby union player, who played first class rugby with the  between 2010 and 2017. His regular position was prop or hooker.

He retired at the end of the 2016 due to work commitments.

Career

Youth
He progressed to the Under-19 side in 2008 and the Under–21 side in 2009 and 2010.

Senior career
In 2010, he was included in the squad for the 2010 Vodacom Cup competition, but was an unused substitute on three occasions.

References

South African rugby union players
Living people
1989 births
People from George, South Africa
SWD Eagles players
Rugby union props
Rugby union players from the Western Cape